Bachelor Creek is a stream in the U.S. state of South Dakota.

Bachelor Creek was named for the fact a large share of the early settlers on the stream were bachelors.

See also
List of rivers of South Dakota

References

Rivers of Lake County, South Dakota
Rivers of Moody County, South Dakota
Rivers of South Dakota